Cornwall College Students' Union provides democratic representation, services, and welfare support to all Cornwall College students, including Duchy College and Falmouth Marine School, across seven campuses.

Structure
Cornwall College Students' Union consists of seventy elected part-time officers, and one full-time sabbatical president.

Each campus elects a: Chair, Vice-Chair, LGBT (Lesbian, Gay, Bisexual, Transsexual) Officer, Women's Officer, BME (Black and Minority Ethnic) Officer, Disabled Students Officer, Entertainments Officer, Sustainability Officer, Communications Officer and Welfare Officer. These officers are collectively known as the Local Student Executive Committee (LSEC). They are responsible for student union activity on each campus.

The Chair and Vice-Chair of each campus sit on the Corporate Student Executive Committee (CSEC). CSEC is the highest decision making body in CCSU. It sets the budget for the academic year, determines what campaigns are run, sets policy that applies to the entire student union, and scrutinises the President.

The full-time sabbatical president is elected by their entire student body on a cross-campus ballot. They are the figurehead of the student union, tasked with managing the day-to-day activity of the student union. The president is the prime representative of the student body, and is expected to represent students both within the college and in the National Union of Students.

Previous Presidents
2011 - 2013- Joe Vinson (elected as Vice President Further Education for the National Union of Students

2009 - 2011- Toni Pearce (elected as Vice President Further Education (2011–2013) for the National Union of Students and National President (2013-) for the National Union of Students

2007 - 2009 - John Clayton

Awards
National Union of Students - Further Education Students' Union of the Year (Runner Up) - 2011, 2010, 2009

References
Cornwall College Students' Union Constitution

External links

Cornwall College Students' Union
Cornwall College

Students' unions in England
Organisations based in Cornwall